Bruce Hoffman (born 1954) is an American political analyst specializing in the study of terrorism and counterterrorism, insurgency and counter-insurgency.

Hoffman is a tenured professor at Georgetown University's Edmund A. Walsh School of Foreign Service, where he directs its Center for Jewish Civilization. Between 2010 and 2017 Hoffman was the director of the Center for Security Studies and director of the security studies program. He is the second longest-serving director in the security center and program's three-decade history.

He is also visiting Professor of Terrorism Studies at St Andrews University, Scotland and is currently the Shelby Cullom and Kathryn W. Davis Senior Fellow at the Council on Foreign Relations and the George H. Gilmore Senior Fellow at the U.S. Military's Combating Terrorism Center.

In May 2022, Virginia Governor Glenn Youngkin appointed Hoffman as a commissioner on the Commonwealth of Virginia's Commission To Combat Antisemitism. He is also a member of the Advisory Council to the James W. Foley Legacy Foundation and a member of the Security Advisory Council of the Community Security Service—the preeminent Jewish volunteer security organization in the United States.

Education
In 1976, Hoffman earned a Bachelor of Arts degree in government and history from Connecticut College. He studied international relations at Oxford University, where he earned a B.Phil. in 1978 and a D.Phil. in 1986.

Career
While a freshman at Connecticut College in 1972, Hoffman became interested in the study of terrorism after watching the Munich Massacre unfold during the 1972 Olympic Games Hoffman began studying these subjects while a graduate student at New College, Oxford, and St Antony's College, Oxford, from 1976 to 1981. In 1981, Hoffman joined the RAND Corporation in Santa Monica, California. He left RAND in 1994 when he was appointed senior lecturer (and, subsequently, reader) in international relations at the University of St Andrews. In 1994, he co-founded (with Professor Paul Wilkinson) and was the first director of the Centre for the Study of Terrorism and Political Violence (CSTPV) at St Andrews, where he was also chairman of the Department of International Relations (1994–1998). Hoffman left St Andrews at the end of 1998 to return RAND as director of RAND's Washington Office (1998–2006), vice president for external affairs at RAND (2001–2004), and acting director of the Center for Middle East Public Policy (2004). He also held the RAND Corporate Chair in Counterterrorism and Counterinsurgency (2006–2006). Hoffman served as a commissioner on the 9/11 Review Commission, which examined the Federal Bureau of Investigation's ability to counter terrorism, radicalization and cyber crime. The commission's unclassified final report was released on March 25, 2015. He was scholar-in-residence for counterterrorism at the Central Intelligence Agency between 2004 and 2006; an adviser on counterterrorism to the Office of National Security Affairs, Coalition Provisional Authority, Baghdad, Iraq in 2004, and from 2004 to 2005 an adviser on counterinsurgency to the Strategy, Plans, and Analysis Office at Multi-National Forces-Iraq Headquarters, Baghdad. Hoffman was also an adviser to the Iraq Study Group (2006).
He was a visiting fellow at All Souls College, Oxford, in 2009. Hoffman has been a public policy fellow and a distinguished scholar at the Woodrow Wilson International Center for Scholars in Washington, D.C., and is currently a Global Wilson Fellow. He was also a visiting professor at S. Rajaratnam School of International Studies, where he was the S. Rajaratnam Professor of Strategic Studies for 2009 and the William F. Podlich Distinguished Fellow and visiting professor of government at Claremont McKenna College in 2016. Hoffman has been teaching at the International Institute for Counterterrorism at the Interdisciplinary Center in Herzliya, Israel, since 2006.

Publications
Hoffman's publications include "Holy Terror": The Implications of Terrorism Motivated by a Religious Imperative (1993). The renowned British historian of intelligence, Professor Christopher Andrew, writes in his book, Secret World: A History of Intelligence, that "Bruce Hoffman, the academic terrorism expert who most clearly identified the future threat from Holy Terror, did so largely because he took a much longer-term view than most intelligence agencies."

Hoffman's own books include: Inside Terrorism (New York: Columbia University Press, 1998; 2nd expanded and revised edition 2006; 3rd expanded and thoroughly revised edition, September 2017); The Failure of Britain's Military Strategy in Palestine, 1939–1947 (Bar-Ilan, Israel; Bar-Ilan University Press,1983); and, Anonymous Soldiers: The Struggle For Israel, 1917–1947 (New York: Knopf, 2015 and New York: Vintage, 2016).

Anonymous Soldiers was awarded the Washington Institute for Near East Studies' Gold Medal for the best book on Middle Eastern politics, history and society published in 2015 and was also named the Jewish Book of the Year for 2015 by the Jewish Book Council. It was cited by both the Kirkus Review and the St. Louis Times-Despatch as one of the "Best Books of the Year, 2015" and was a New York Times Book Review "Editors' Choice." Columbia University Press recognized Inside Terrorism as one of the 25 notable books published by the press in its 125-year-long history.

Hoffman is the editor-in-chief of the scholarly journal, Studies in Conflict and Terrorism; and, the series editor of Columbia Studies in Terrorism and Irregular Warfare, published by Columbia University Press. He co-edited with Fernando Reinares The Evolution of the Global Terrorist Threat: From 9/11 to Osama bin Laden's Death (New York: Columbia University Press, 2014).

Hoffman was a regular contributor to The Atlantic Monthly. He was a featured author for the cover of the January 2002 issue ("The Hard Questions—Must We Torture?: A Nasty Business") and was the author of the June 2003 cover story, "The Logic of Suicide Terrorism." Between 2001 and 2006 Hoffman wrote six other articles and reviews for that magazine. Since 2008, Hoffman has also contributed fourteen articles to the hardcopy and online versions of The National Interest, and was also the author of the January/February 2009 cover story, "Obama's Angels: Can Hillary & Co. Keep Us Safe?—The Age of Woman."

Hoffman has been profiled in The New Yorker by Nicolas Leman ("Letter From Washington: What Terrorists Want—Rethinking the fight against bin Laden," October 29, 2001); in the Los Angeles Times ("Putting Theory Into Practice," November 18, 2001); the Süddeutsche Zeitung Magazin ("Die Dunkle Seite Der Macht: Bruce Hoffman its der machtigste Politikberater der Welt—Bruce Allmachig/The Dark Side Of Power: Bruce Hoffman is the most powerful political adviser in the world—Bruce Almighty," November 12, 2004); and, was the subject of a front-page article in the New York Sunday Times Week in Review, titled, "A Not Very Private Feud Over Terrorism" (June 8, 2008). He was among the students and faculty at Georgetown University's Walsh School of Foreign Service profiled in the school's alumni magazine (pp. 12–19) for their role in assisting Afghans to flee their country after the Taliban seized control of Afghanistan in August 2021 

Hoffman is also president and CEO of The Hoffman Group, an international counterterrorism executive education, training, and consultancy.

Hoffman was cited by Washingtonian magazine in its March 2021 cover story as among the "250 Most Influential People" "who'll be playing the biggest roles in federal Washington's policy debates of the next few years." He was listed in the "National Security And Defense" category. He was named one of "Washington DC's 500 Most Influential People" by Washingtonian magazine in its May 2022 special supplement, again in the "National Security And Defense" category.

Awards

In November 1994, the director of Central Intelligence awarded Hoffman the United States Intelligence Community Seal Medallion the highest level of commendation given to a non-government employee, which recognizes sustained superior performance of high value that distinctly benefits the interests and national security of the United States. In 1998, Hoffman became the first recipient of the Santiago Grisolía Chair and first winner of the Prize for Excellence in the Study of Violence award by Queen Sofia Centre for the Study of Violence, Valencia, Spain. He was a World Economic Forum Fellow (2003-2005); an honorary degree recipient and inductee into the Garfield Society from Hiram College, Hiram, Ohio in 2006; and, was a fellow and C. V. Starr Distinguished Visitor at the American Academy of Berlin, Germany that same year. In 2016, Hoffman was awarded the Harriet Buescher Lawrence '34 Prize to Connecticut College Alumni for Leadership or Inspiring Others for Good Through Direct Service by the Connecticut College Alumni Association, New London, CT. In May 2021, Georgetown University's School of Foreign Service Academic Council gave Hoffman the School of Foreign Service Faculty of the Year Award. He played goalkeeper in 1979 and 1980 for the Israeli National Field Hockey Team.

References

External links
 
 

Walsh School of Foreign Service faculty
Connecticut College alumni
Alumni of the University of Oxford
1954 births
Living people
Experts on terrorism
American foreign policy writers
American male non-fiction writers
American political writers